Neelakantapuram Raghuveera Reddy Yadav (born 12 February 1957) is an Indian politician belonging to the Indian National Congress. He was appointed President, Andhra Pradesh Congress Committee in March, 2014.

Early life
Raghuveera Reddy was born on 12 February 1957 in Anantapur district to N. Kaveerappa and he belongs to a Yadava caste. He did his B.Sc. and Bachelors in Law from SK University.

Kannada film director Prashanth Neel is Reddy's cousin.

Career
Raghuveera Reddy Yadav, is a three times M.L.A. from Madakasira Assembly Constituency. He has been changed to Kalyandurg Constituency during 2009 elections after the reorganisation of constituencies. Raghuveera Reddy contested and won from Kalyandurg Assembly Constituency in 2009 elections.

He served as a Minister for Agriculture in Y. S. Rajasekhar Reddy’s cabinet and continued with the same in Konijeti Rosaiah’s government as well. In Nallari Kiran Kumar Reddy's government he had crucial portfolio of Revenue Minister in the reorganisation of cabinet.

President, APCC
He was elected as the Congress Committee President for the residual Andhra Pradesh (post bifurcation into Andhra Pradesh and Telangana) on 11 March 2014.

Personal life
N.Raghuveera Reddy, is married to Sunitha and has a daughter and a son.

Positions held
 President for Students Union, S.K. University, Anantapur
 Chairman, Neelakantapuram Group of Temples
 Chairman, Kallur Subbarao Trust
 Minister for Agriculture, Government of Andhra Pradesh in 2004, 2009 cabinets.
 Minister for Revenue Minister, Government of Andhra Pradesh in the recent reformation of cabinet
 APPCC President 2014-2019

References

Indian National Congress politicians from Andhra Pradesh
Living people
1957 births
People from Anantapur district
Andhra Pradesh MLAs 1989–1994
State cabinet ministers of Andhra Pradesh
Andhra Pradesh MLAs 1994–1999
Andhra Pradesh MLAs 1999–2004
Andhra Pradesh MLAs 2004–2009
Andhra Pradesh MLAs 2009–2014